Betsy Youngman (born August 4, 1959) is an American cross-country skier. She competed at the 1988 Winter Olympics and the 1992 Winter Olympics.

Cross-country skiing results
All results are sourced from the International Ski Federation (FIS).

Olympic Games

World Cup

Season standings

References

External links
 

1959 births
Living people
American female cross-country skiers
Olympic cross-country skiers of the United States
Cross-country skiers at the 1988 Winter Olympics
Cross-country skiers at the 1992 Winter Olympics
Sportspeople from Cleveland
21st-century American women